Vute is a Mambiloid language of Cameroon and Gabon, with a thousand speakers in Nigeria. The orthography was standardized on March 9, 1979.  Noted dialect clusters are eastern, central, and Doume.

Phonology

Consonants

Consonants in Vute are numerous and include pulmonic and implosive airstreams. Labialization is phonemic in many consonants, some of which is dialectal.

Tones

There are more phonemic tones than are marked in orthography, such as mid-high rising tone and mid tone being both unmarked  for example. Phonologically conditioned downstep is unmarked.

*Only in eastern dialects, on short vowels. All other dialects merge this class with low tone.

Vowels

* /ɔ/ only contrasts from /o/ in open syllables and before velar final consonants: /k/ and /ŋ/. When preceding bilabial and alveolar final consonants, [ɔ] is understood to be an allophone of /o/.

† Low frequency

References

Mambiloid languages
Languages of Cameroon
Languages of Nigeria